The cyan hap (Pseudotropheus cyaneus) is a species of cichlid endemic to Lake Malawi where it is only known from Chinyamwezi Island.  It prefers areas with plentiful rocks down to a depth of approximately  where it can graze from the rocks.  This species can reach a length of  SL.  It can also be found in the aquarium trade.

References

cyan hap
cyan hap
Taxonomy articles created by Polbot
Taxobox binomials not recognized by IUCN